WQOW (channel 18) is a television station in Eau Claire, Wisconsin, United States, serving the Chippewa Valley as an affiliate of ABC. Owned by Allen Media Broadcasting, the station has studios on Friedeck Road in Eau Claire, and its transmitter is located in Altoona, Wisconsin.

Although identifying as a separate station in its own right, WQOW is considered a semi-satellite of WXOW (channel 19) in La Crosse. As such, it simulcasts all network and syndicated programming as provided through its parent but airs separate commercial inserts, legal identifications, local newscasts and Sunday morning religious programs, and has its own website. WQOW serves the northern half of the La Crosse–Eau Claire market while WXOW serves the southern portion. The two stations are counted as a single unit for ratings purposes. Although WQOW maintains its own facilities, master control and some internal operations are based at the WXOW studios on County Highway 25 in La Crescent, Minnesota. DirecTV and Dish Network offer both WXOW and WQOW as of September 2010.

History
WQOW signed-on for the first time on September 22, 1980; the station was originally owned by Liberty Television, which had acquired WXOW two years earlier. For its first decade on-the-air, WXOW had been hampered by an inadequate signal in the northern half of the combined market, and cable viewers watched ABC from the Minneapolis–Saint Paul market (by sign-on, this was KSTP-TV). Unlike the area's other stations, WXOW's transmitter is located alongside its studios in La Crescent, Minnesota. As a result, viewers in Eau Claire and the Chippewa Valley could only watch the station on cable.

Its original studios were on Business US 53 (Hastings Way) east of the London Square Mall and then-current interchange with WIS 93 on the southeast side of Eau Claire. Originally, WQOW was a straight simulcast of WXOW, except for identifications and commercials. However, since 1982, it has evolved into a more localized station. In 1985, WQOW was acquired by Tak Communications, which would file for Chapter 11 bankruptcy six years later. A group of creditors seized Tak's assets in 1994, and the company's Wisconsin stations were purchased by Shockley Communications in 1995 as part of Tak's liquidation.

Since the new US 53 Bypass was set to be constructed on the site of WQOW's building, the station moved in January 2001, six months before it was acquired by Quincy Media (then known as Quincy Newspapers). The old building's site is located approximately in the northbound lane of the bypass near the WIS 93 northbound bridge. The new building is on WIS 93 immediately south of I-94 on the south side of Eau Claire.

WQOW/WXOW began operating a cable-only affiliate of The WB, known as "WBCZ", in 1998. It would be replaced with new second digital subchannels (simulcasting The CW) when it launched in the fall of 2006. After The CW Plus national service was upgraded to 720p high definition level in 2012, an HD feed became available on Charter digital channel 610. WQOW began airing solely in digital, effective February 17, 2009, with the analog transmitter operating for sixty additional days broadcasting only local news and information about the digital transition.

In July 2009, Dish Network announced it would add WQOW to its local channel lineup in the Eau Claire area after previously only offering WXOW. WQOW/WXOW launched This TV simulcast on new digital third digital subchannels of the stations in February/March 2010. Following the collapse of WEAU's tower on March 22, 2011, WQOW temporarily discontinued This TV on 18.3 in order to provide space to broadcast WEAU temporarily on its subchannel until a new tower was erected. This TV returned to WXOW and WQOW after 10 years in August 2021.

In January 2021, Gray Television announced its intent to purchase Quincy Media for $925 million. As Gray already owns the market's WEAU, it planned to keep that station and sell both WQOW and WXOW in order to satisfy FCC requirements. On April 29, Gray announced that WQOW and WXOW would be divested to Allen Media Broadcasting. The sale was completed on August 1; on that day, WEAU assumed the CW and MeTV affiliations from WQOW/WXOW.

Programming
Syndicated programming on WQOW includes Tamron Hall, Inside Edition, Dr. Phil, Rachael Ray and Live with Kelly and Ryan, among others. The station is also a part of the Green Bay Packers and WIAA sports networks; the former allows WQOW to carry Packers preseason games and official team programming, and to brand itself as "Your Official Packers Station" for the Eau Claire market.

Newscasts
With the launch of WQOW, WXOW began to simulcast its newscasts on that station; one of the few splits between La Crosse and Eau Claire at launch was that WQOW produced cut-ins during Good Morning America. In Eau Claire, reporters were stationed to provide coverage into WXOW's regional news, seen in both cities.

In 1982, WQOW established a separate news operation with local newscasts focusing on Eau Claire and the surrounding area. Since it did not operate an in-house weather department of its own, all segments originated from WXOW's studios in a tape-delayed arrangement. The effort was cancelled in March 1990 as a cost-cutting measure; as a result, WQOW once again began simulcasting WXOW's newscasts.

It would not be until October 14, 1996—after the Shockley purchase—when WQOW would relaunch its own local news operation for a second time. Although this incarnation of news production includes a separate weather department from WXOW, meteorologists from that station can fill-in on WQOW (this is the case especially on weekends and for severe weather coverage transitioning between each station's coverage area). In September 2011, WXOW became the second television station in the market to perform an upgrade to high definition newscast production. Included in the change was a new studio and updated graphics package. The news department at WQOW was upgraded to HD level at the same time.

Subchannels
The station's digital signal is multiplexed:

References

External links
WQOW
WQOW mobile

QOW
Entertainment Studios
ABC network affiliates
Decades (TV network) affiliates
This TV affiliates
Television channels and stations established in 1980
1980 establishments in Wisconsin
Court TV affiliates
True Crime Network affiliates